Constantin Mâțu was a Romanian journalist and lawyer from Chișinău, Bessarabia. He served as the president of Journalists and Lawyers Association in Bessarabia during the interwar period.

Biography
He worked for the daily Cuvântul Nou (7 March - 1 August 1920), weekly Glasul Basarabiei (1921–1922, 1926–1927), weekly Cuvântul Basarabiei (August–September 1923), Viitorul Nostru (1923), Basarabia Românească (1932).

Between 24 October and 17 November 1923, Constantin Mâțu and Ion Pelivan edited Gazeta Basarabiei, a weekly of the Romanian National Party.

He served as the president of Journalists and Lawyers Association in Bessarabia during the interwar period.

Works
 Constantin Mâțu, O necesitate desconsiderată: Presa românească în Basarabia, Chișinău, Tip. Eparhială „Cartea Românească”, 1930, 30 p.

References

External links 
 PRESA BASARABEANĂ de la începuturi pînă în anul 1957. Catalog

Writers from Chișinău
20th-century Romanian lawyers
Romanian journalists
Moldovan journalists
Male journalists
Year of birth missing
Year of death missing
People from Chișinău